Natale Cirino (5 February 1894 – 29 May 1962) was an Italian stage and film actor.

Life and career 
Born in Catania, Cirino started his career entering the most important theatrical companies active in Sicily (including the ones held by Turi Pandolfini, Michele Abruzzo, Rosina Anselmi and Giovanni Grasso) before forming his own stage company in 1928. In 1943 he made his film debut in the  Pino Mercanti's historical drama All'ombra della gloria, and from then he started an intense career as a character actor, with some sporadic main roles. He was married to stage actress Rita Alaimo (1894-1964).

Selected filmography
 For the Love of Mariastella (1946)
 Appointment for Murder (1951) 
 The Crossroads (1951)
 Carcerato (1951)
 Lorenzaccio (1951)
 Buon viaggio pover'uomo (1951)
 Ergastolo (1952)
 Saluti e baci (1953)
 It Happened at the Police Station (1954)
 Letter from Naples (1954)
 Tragic Ballad (1954)
 Maddalena (1954)
 Buonanotte... avvocato! (1955)
 Andalusia Express (1956)
 The Knight of the Black Sword (1956)
 Arrivano i dollari! (1957)

References

External links 
 

1894 births
1962 deaths
20th-century Italian male actors
Italian male film actors
Italian male stage actors
Actors from Catania